Buck Owens is the debut album on Capitol Records by Buck Owens, released in 1961. It would mark the beginning of a long association for Owens with producer Ken Nelson.

Owens' single "High as the Mountain" reached Number 27 on the Billboard Country Singles charts. It, and "Nobody's Fool But Yours", is included as a bonus track on the 1995 re-issue by Sundazed Records.

Reception

In his Allmusic review, critic Cub Koda wrote of the CD reissue "Featuring Owens' early development of the Bakersfield sound... Transfers are astonishingly crisp and clear, showing producer Ken Nelson's touch to good advantage. The sound that became the legend starts right here."

Track listing
All songs by Buck Owens unless otherwise noted.
 "Above and Beyond" (Harlan Howard) – 2:24
 "Second Fiddle" – 2:03
 "Tired of Livin'" – 2:00
 "I Gotta Right to Know" (Owens, Rolly Weber) – 2:32
 "Excuse Me (I Think I've Got a Heartache)" (Howard, Owens) – 2:25
 "I'll Give My Heart to You" – 2:00
 "Under Your Spell Again" – 2:40
 "My Everlasting Love" – 2:16
 "Take Me Back Again" – 2:36
 "'Til These Dreams Come True" (Owens, Dusty Rhodes) – 2:26
 "Walk the Floors" (Owens, Rhodes) – 2:23
 "I'll Take a Chance on Loving You" (Buck Owens, Lucy Cole)– 2:01
1995 re-issue bonus tracks:
 "High as the Mountain" – 2:21
 "Nobody's Fool But Yours" – 2:14

Recorded
Oct 9, 1958, Capitol Recording Studio, Hollywood (2,8,11,12)
June 16, 1959, Capitol Recording Studio, Hollywood (3,7)
Dec 23, 1959, Capitol Recording Studio, Hollywood (1,4,5,10)
Dec 3, 1960, Capitol Recording Studio, Hollywood (6,9)

References

1961 albums
Buck Owens albums
Capitol Records albums
Albums produced by Ken Nelson (United States record producer)

Albums recorded at Capitol Studios